Ogygioses is a genus of moths of the family Palaeosetidae. Ogygioses luangensis is found in Thailand and the other Ogygioses species are found in Taiwan.

Species
Ogygioses caliginosa Issiki and Stringer, 1932
Ogygioses eurata Issiki and Stringer, 1932
Ogygioses issikii Davis, 1995
Ogygioses luangensis Kristensen, 1995

References

Hepialoidea
Exoporia genera